Sones de Mariachi is a piece for large orchestra composed by Mexican composer Blas Galindo and published in 1941. This piece is a rewrite of his earlier work "Mariachi Sones" for small orchestra, from 1940, elaborated on the occasion of the exhibition "20 Centuries of Mexican Art" which was held at the Museum of Modern Art in New York, for the Mexican music program that addressed the conductor and composer Carlos Chávez.

The work, whose title evokes the juicy melodies that are played by folk instrumental ensembles called mariachi, is based on three pieces: Son de la Negra, The Vulture and The four real.

References 
 "Reflexiones sobre el nacionalismo musical mexicano". Alcaraz, José Antonio, (1991) . Ed. Patria.

External links 
 
 

Compositions by Blas Galindo
Compositions for orchestra